Kühsen is a municipality in the district of Lauenburg, in Schleswig-Holstein, Germany. It is around 20 km south of Lübeck, and around 40 km north-east of Hamburg.

References

Municipalities in Schleswig-Holstein
Herzogtum Lauenburg